Scandinavian Airlines (SAS), previously known as Scandinavian Airlines System, is the national airline of Denmark, Norway and Sweden. Headquartered in Sigtuna outside Stockholm, Sweden, it operates out of three main hubs, Copenhagen Airport, Stockholm-Arlanda Airport and Oslo Airport, Gardermoen. Owned by the eponymous SAS Group, the airline transported 22.9 million passengers to 90 destinations on an average 683 flights daily in 2011. As of February 2021, SAS utilize 164 aircraft—jetliners and turboprops—consisting of 64 Boeing 737, 28 Bombardier CRJ900 operated by Nordica and Cityjet, 44 Airbus A319/A320/A321, 9 Airbus A330, 8 Airbus A350 and 10 ATR 72's operated by Nordica and FlyBe. In addition there are 2 Bombardier CRJ1000 leased from Air Nostrum.

The airline has operated over 700 aircraft throughout its history. It was a loyal customer of Douglas Aircraft Company and its successor McDonnell Douglas, operating 290 aircraft and all major models from the DC-3 through the MD-90, except for the MD-11 and the MD-95 (AKA: Boeing 717-200). Boeing is the second-largest manufacturer, with 127 aircraft, of which 105 were 737s. Other manufacturers have been Fokker (51 aircraft), Bombardier (40), Airbus (29), Convair (22), Sud Aviation (21), Saab (14), Vickers (9), ATR (6), British Aerospace (3), British Aircraft Corporation (2), Junkers (2) and Shorts (2). SAS has been the launch customer of the Saab Scandia, the Sud Aviation Caravelle, the McDonnell Douglas DC-9-20 and -40 and the Boeing 737-600. SAS was the sole customer of the DC-9-20; the DC-9-40 served SAS for 34 years—longer than any other model. Fourteen aircraft have been involved in hull-loss accidents, four of which were fatal.

SAS started as a cooperation between Norwegian Air Lines (DNL), Aerotransport (ABA), Swedish Intercontinental Airlines (SILA) and Danish Air Lines (DDL), who created Overseas Scandinavian Airlines System (OSAS) in 1946 and European Scandinavian Airlines System (ESAS) two years later. The airlines merged to create the SAS consortium in 1951. In the early years, SAS would rapidly purchase the newest intercontinental aircraft and gradually relegate them to European and then domestic service. The Caravelle was introduced in 1959 as SAS' first jetliner; intercontinental jet services commenced with the Douglas DC-8 the following year. The consortium created Scanair as a charter sister company in 1961. SAS Commuter was created in 1984 to operate regional airliners. The last such aircraft were retired in 2010. SAS bought its main competitors Linjeflyg of Sweden in 1993 and Braathens of Norway in 2001; the latter was merged to operate as SAS Braathens in Norway between 2004 and 2007.

Livery
During the negotiations to create OSAS, the airlines quickly agreed that they would need a common profile and naming style. Referencing Vikings allowed the airline to play on a common history between the Scandinavian countries, while giving a global distinctive and recognizable mark. The aircraft were painted with a livery consisting of a dragon's head, iconic of the Viking longships, in combination with a cheatline which intersected with the windows such as to visualize the shields hung on the side of the longships.

After Jan Carlzon's appointment as chief executive officer in 1981, he introduced a "new corporate identity" for the airline. In addition to a change of operating policy, it gave the airline a new graphical identity and livery. Carlzon was especially opposed to the Viking markings, as he believed people did not understand the dragon head reference and otherwise associated Vikings with pillage and rape. Early proposals called for green aircraft—considered neutral in relation to the Scandinavian national colors. The re-branding job was then issued to Landor Associates, who initially proposed the "Royal Scandinavian" brand with an oriental design, but this was discarded. The roll-out of the "Carlzon livery" took place on 12 April 1983 saw a white body with slanted vertical stripes in the Scandinavian flags' colors.

SAS' current livery was first presented in September 1998 with the introduction of the Boeing 737 Next Generation. Part of a company-wide new identity, SAS 2000+, the aircraft were given a white body, "Scandinavian" was replaced with "Scandinavian Airlines", the vertical stabilizer was painted blue and the engines red. The three national flags with crowns were replaced with matrix representing the Scandinavian flags. Operations in Norway were branded SAS Braathens between 2004 and 2007, receiving a distinct livery based on the main SAS scheme.

A number of special paint jobs have been carried out. In the mid-1990s, SAS started a scheme to cover MD-80 in single colors overlaid with small, white aircraft silhouettes, but the project was abandoned after two aircraft. As SAS was one of the main sponsors of the 1994 Winter Olympics in Lillehammer, it painted one aircraft in a Lillehammer '94 scheme. Similarly a Copenhagen '96 scheme was painted for Copenhagen's term as the European Capital of Culture. Since 2002, SAS has painted selected aircraft in a Star Alliance livery. With the delivery of the A319 in 2006, one aircraft was delivered in a retro Viking scheme.

Naming
DDL and ABA had given their aircraft geographic names, such as DDL's Dania and Jutlandia and ABA's Svealand and Lappland. DNL had named their aircraft for Norwegian folklore and animals, such as Askeladden and Valkyrien. ABA introduced animal names, such as Falken, from the 1930s. SILA originally gave "Yankee names", such as Jim and Bob, later changing to winds, such as Nordan and Monsun.

OSAS' Viking concept resulted in the aircraft being named in the format "Foo Viking", such as Dana Viking and Olav Viking, where the first part was the given name of a historical kings and chieftain from the Viking Age. Names were selected by the Fleet Development Division in cooperation with the University of Oslo. With the creation of the consortium, five rules were formulated for the naming: the larger the aircraft, the more prominent Viking it was to be named after; aircraft were to be named for kings, chieftains, seafarers and scribes from the Viking Age; names of gods in Norse mythology were not used; names of non-Scandinavian origin were not used; and names containing the Scandinavian letters æ, ä, ø, ö and å were omitted. A lack of prominent Swedish Vikings caused SAS to later also allow people from the Yngling period to be used.

A naming exception was Huge Viking, which was used for a Boeing 747. Huge was the quickest being in Norse mythology, but the name also played on the words English meaning. SAS reuses the names from retired aircraft, except for those of crashed aircraft. Because of oversights, the name Agnar and Rane have however been reused. A similar naming convention, albeit using the full name of kings, was used by Braathens SAFE of Norway and Loftleiðir of Iceland. As Carlzon was opposed to the Viking references, he also proposed that the names be abolished. The executive management reverted its decision following massive protests from within the airline. Female aircraft names were introduced by Scanair in 1980, who gave them to all their Douglas DC-8s. SAS followed suit in 1989, when the entire series of Boeing 767 were named for prominent female Vikings. Scandinavian letters were introduced from the 1990s. SAS Commuter's Norwegian Fokker 50 aircraft were given names for places in Norway, such as Lakselv.

Aircraft
The list includes aircraft operated in the European Scandinavian Airlines System pool, operated by Aerotransport, Norwegian Air Lines and Danish Air Lines, by the consortium Overseas Scandinavian Airlines System, the consolidated Scandinavian Airlines System (later Scandinavian Airlines), and the SAS-branded SAS Commuter and SAS Braathens. It excludes other airlines within the SAS Group not branded as "SAS" or "Scandinavian", including Scanair, Spanair, Blue1 and Widerøe.

The list includes the manufacturer, model, the total quantity operated by SAS (the peak quantity may be lower), the current quantity operated as of October 2018, the number of passengers (pax), and the years the first aircraft entered (start) and last aircraft retired (end) from service.

References

Footnotes

Bibliography

External link

Aircraft
Scandinavian airlines